William or Bill Schulz may refer to:

 William R. Schulz (born 1931), American politician
 Bill Schulz (editor) (William Martin Schulz, 1939–2019), American conservative journalist and editor
 William F. Schulz (born 1949), American human rights activist
 Bill Schulz (television personality) (William Dawes Schulz, born 1975), American journalist, writer, and television personality

See also
 William Schultz (disambiguation)
 William T. Schulte (1890–1966), American politician
 William Schutz (1925–2002), American psychologist